The Saint Cydroine Church is a Romanesque church dating from the eleventh and twelfth centuries.
It is among the oldest in the Yonne department, located in the town of Laroche-Saint-Cydroine in France.

It was originally an abbey church of a Benedictine priory depending on the abbey of La Charité-sur-Loire. 
It is dedicated to Saint Cydroine, a 4th century Roman Christian martyr beheaded by the Romans on the site of the building.
Its two-storey octagonal bell tower and the sculptural decoration of its capitals make it one of the masterpieces of Romanesque art of the icaunais.
It has been classified as a historical monument since 1905.

History 

The present church was probably built in the eleventh century at the top of a hill overlooking the right bank of the Yonne River.
It is on the site of the martyrdom of Saint Cydroine and replaced a primitive abbey church, cited in the Sacramentary as a parish from the ninth century, for use by the Abbey of Saint-Amand.
The priory then belonged to the monks of the abbey of Saint-Rémi de Sens who ceded it to the Benedictine monastery of La Charité-sur-Loire.
This belonged to the Order of Cluny.
A first mention of the priory dates from 1162 in a pontifical act where Pope Alexander II settled a neighborhood dispute between the Benedictine monks of La Charité-sur-Loire who lived there and the Premonstratensians of Dilo. 

Some of the oldest elements (bell tower, choir and transept) in Romanesque style can be dated to the end of the 11th century, while the nave and other later elements date from the 12th century and the 13th century.

Architecture

Exterior 
The tower is octagonal straddling the transept.

Interior 

The plan in a Greek cross and three circular apses:
 Length of the nave: 
 Width of the nave: 
 Width at the sanctuary: 
 Height of the vault of the nave: 
 Height of the sanctuary:

Sculpture 

The Romanesque interior decor is original, with elephants on the capitals, exotic trees, cats,  chimaeras etc.

Gallery

Notes

Citations

Sources

11th-century Roman Catholic church buildings in France
Churches in Yonne
Romanesque architecture in France